Vashon Eagleson was an American football coach.  He served as the second head football coach at the North Carolina College for Negroes—now known as North Carolina Central University—in Durham, North Carolina and he held that position for four seasons, from 1923 to 1926.  His coaching record at North Carolina Central was 4–12–1.

There is no record of the first football coach at the school, but there is a record of the first football game.  In 1922, the year before Eagleson started, North Carolina Central played one football game against Saint Paul's College, Virginia and lost by a score of 25–0.

References

Year of birth missing
Year of death missing
North Carolina Central Eagles football coaches